"Lovelight" is a song written and originally performed by Lewis Taylor for his 2002 album, Stoned, Part I. In 2006, the song was covered by British singer Robbie Williams. His version was produced by Mark Ronson and was released as the second single from his seventh solo album, Rudebox, on 13 November 2006. Williams' version reached number eight on the UK Singles Chart and became a top-10 hit in five other European countries.

Chart performance
"Lovelight" debuted at number 28 on the UK Singles Chart, a week before its physical single release. The song debuted on the Download Chart at number 29, later peaking at number 15. After its physical release, "Lovelight" reached number eight on the UK Singles Chart. In Sweden, the song debuted at number 23 on the Sverigetopplistan chart on digital single sales only. In Australia, "Lovelight" debuted at number 38 on the ARIA Top 40 Digital Track Chart. In the Netherlands, the song peaked at number eight on the Dutch Top 40.

Music video
"Lovelight" features a music video that was directed by Jake Nava and filmed in Vienna, Austria during a break from Robbie Williams' European Close Encounters Tour. The video features Williams performing in a dark club (Semper Depot, Lehárgasse 6–8, Vienna-Mariahilf) accompanied by female dancers. The video premiered on ITV1 in the UK on 6 October 2006.

Track listings

UK CD1 and European CD single
 "Lovelight"
 "Mess Me Up"

UK CD2
 "Lovelight" (album version)
 "Lovelight" (Soulwax Ravelight vocal mix)
 "Lovelight" (Kurd Maverick vocal mix)
 "Lovelight" (Soul Mekanik Mekanikal mix)
 "Lovelight" (Dark Horse mix)
 "Lovelight" (Soulwax Ravelight dub)

UK DVD single
 "Lovelight" (video)
 "Mess Me Up" (audio)
 "Lovelight" (Soul Mekanik Mekanikal mix audio)
 DVD trailer
 Photo gallery

Italian 12-inch single
A1. "Lovelight" (Kurd Maverick vocal) – 6:47
A2. "Lovelight" (Kurd Maverick dub) – 8:04
B1. "Lovelight" – 4:02
B2. "Lovelight" (Soulwax Ravelight vocal) – 6:56

Australian CD single
 "Lovelight" (album version)
 "Lovelight" (Soulwax Ravelight vocal mix)
 "Lovelight" (Kurd Maverick vocal mix)
 "Lovelight" (Soul Mekanik Mekanikal mix)
 "Lovelight" (Dark Horse mix)

Credits and personnel
Credits are taken from the Rudebox album booklet.

Studios
 Recorded at Chung King and Allido Sound (New York City)
 Mixed at MixStar Studios (Virginia Beach, Virginia)
 Mastered at Metropolis Studios (London, England)

Personnel

 Lewis Taylor – writing
 Robbie Williams – lead vocals
 N'Dea Davenport – backing vocals
 Mark Ronson – electric guitar, scratches, beats, percussion, production, engineering
 Andrew Levy – bass guitar
 Raymond Angry – Fender Rhodes, Roland strings
 Sam Koppelman – percussion
 Dave Guy – trumpet
 Neal Sugarman – tenor saxophone
 Ian Hendrickson-Smith – baritone saxophone
 Serban Ghenea – mixing
 Vaughan Merrick – engineering
 Derek Pacuk – engineering
 Andy Marcinkowski – engineering assistance
 Jesse Gladstone – engineering assistance
 Tony Cousins – mastering

Charts

Weekly charts

Year-end charts

Release history

References

External links
  Article about music video location

2003 songs
2006 singles
Chrysalis Records singles
Music videos directed by Jake Nava
Robbie Williams songs
Song recordings produced by Mark Ronson